Phoenicoprocta teda is a moth in the subfamily Arctiinae. It was described by Francis Walker in 1854. It is found in Santa Catarina, Brazil.

References

Moths described in 1854
Euchromiina